Oxythyrea funesta is a phytophagous beetle species belonging to the family Cetoniidae, subfamily Cetoniinae.

Common name “White spotted rose beetle”.

This beetle is present in most of Europe, in the eastern Palearctic realm, and in the Near East.

Larvae are up to 30 mm long, they feed on plant roots and can remain until next spring in the soil.

They are considered an insect pest that do not just feed on pollen, but rode the floral organs, especially damaging light in color buds and flowers.

Their colour is black, more or less bronzed. Most of the specimens show six white spots in two longitudinal rows on the pronotum and many others on the elytra. They are completely covered with white pubescence (easily visible in profile).  Older specimens usually have no hairs, as they are rubbed off with time.

Subspecies
 Oxythyrea funesta var. consobrina  Villa
 Oxythyrea funesta var. deleta  Mulsant

External links
 Biolib
 Fauna europaea

Cetoniinae
Beetles of Europe
Beetles described in 1761
Articles containing video clips
Taxa named by Nikolaus Poda von Neuhaus